Federal Route 149, or Jalan Bukit Tambun, is a federal road in Penang, Malaysia.

Features
At most sections, the Federal Route 149 was built under the JKR R5 road standard, allowing maximum speed limit of up to 90 km/h.

List of junctions

References

Malaysian Federal Roads